Priapulidae is the canonical family of priapulid worms, comprising Priapulus and Priapulosis as well as the Carboniferous genus Priapulites.

References 

Ecdysozoa families
Priapulida